The 2018 Auburn Tigers football team represented Auburn University in the 2018 NCAA Division I FBS football season. The Tigers played their home games at Jordan–Hare Stadium in Auburn, Alabama and competed in the Western Division of the Southeastern Conference (SEC). They were led by sixth-year head coach Gus Malzahn. The Tigers finished the season 8–5, 3–5 in SEC play to finish 5th in the West Division. They were invited to the Music City Bowl, where they defeated Purdue.

Previous season
The Tigers finished the 2017 season 10–4, 7–1 in SEC play to win a share of the Western Division title with Alabama. Due to their head-to-head win over Alabama, they represented the Western Division in the SEC Championship Game and lost to Georgia. They were invited to the Peach Bowl where they lost to UCF.

Recruiting

Position key

Recruits

The Tigers signed a total of 24 recruits.

Spring game
The A-Day spring game was held on Saturday, April 7.  Bad weather led to the lowest attendance for A-Day in the Gus Malzahn era as head coach, as only 28,033 showed up.  The game was dominated by defense, and only 28 total points were scored between the two teams.  Many starters did not play or did not see significant time on the field due to the amount of injuries Auburn had already suffered during the spring.  For their performances, C.J. Tolbert was named Offensive MVP, Nick Coe was named Defensive MVP, and Anders Carlson was named Special Teams MVP.

Preseason

Award watch lists
Listed in the order that they were released

SEC media poll
The SEC media poll was released on July 20, 2018 with the Tigers predicted to finish in second place in the West Division.

Preseason All-SEC teams
The Tigers had nine players selected to the preseason all-SEC teams.

Offense

2nd team

Jarrett Stidham – QB

Ryan Davis – WR

3rd team

Marquel Harrell – OL

Defense

2nd team

Derrick Brown – DL

Deshaun Davis – LB

Jamel Dean – DB

2nd team

Dontavius Russell – DL

Marlon Davidson – DL

Javaris Davis – DB

Schedule

Game summaries

vs. No. 6 Washington

Alabama State

No. 12 LSU

Arkansas

Southern Miss

at Mississippi State

Tennessee

at Ole Miss

No. 25 Texas A&M

at No. 5 Georgia

Liberty

at No. 1 Alabama

vs. Purdue

Rankings

Players drafted into the NFL

References

Auburn
Auburn Tigers football seasons
Music City Bowl champion seasons
Auburn Tigers football